Haffner Pass is a pass running northeast–southwest and rising to about  between Gilbert Glacier and Mozart Ice Piedmont in northern Alexander Island, Antarctica. It was surveyed by the British Antarctic Survey, 1975–77, and was named by the UK Antarctic Place-Names Committee in 1980 after Wolfgang Amadeus Mozart's Haffner Symphony (1782) in association with the name of the Mozart Ice Piedmont.

See also 
 Snick Pass
 Tufts Pass
 Whistle Pass

External links 
 Haffner Pass on USGS website
 Haffner Pass on AADC website
 Haffner Pass on SCAR website
 Haffner Pass on geographic.org
 Haffner Pass on mindat.org

References 

Mountain passes of Alexander Island